Tail codes on the U.S. Navy aircraft are the markings that help to identify the aircraft's unit and/or base assignment. These codes comprise one or two letters or digits painted on both sides of the vertical stabilizer, on the top right and on the bottom left wings near the tip. Although located both on the vertical stabilizer and the wings from their inception in July 1945, these identification markings are commonly referred as tail codes. It is important to note that tail codes are meant to identify units and assignments, not individual aircraft. For all aircraft of the U.S. Navy and U.S. Marine Corps unique identification is provided by bureau numbers.

History
The U.S. Navy introduced the identification system of tail and wing letter codes for its aircraft in July 1945. This system was intended to replace the set of geometrical symbols employed for the similar purpose since January 1945. When introduced, tail codes were only given to aircraft carriers. New directives issued in 1946 and in 1948 assigned tail codes to individual Navy and Marine Corps squadrons as well as for carrier air groups. And although the association between particular tail codes and units undergoes changes from time to time, the system as a whole is still in use to present day.

Basic principles

 When introduced in June 1945, tail codes were assigned to individual aircraft carriers. Thus all aircraft based on a particular ship were supposed to carry the ship's code. As of August 1948, tail codes were no longer assigned to aircraft carriers but rather to carrier air groups, which in December 1963 were re-designated as carrier air wings.
 U.S. Navy carrier-based squadrons that deploy as whole units, like fighter and attack squadrons, use their parent carrier air wing tail codes; these types of squadrons are normally not issued individual tail codes.
 Other types of the Navy's carrier-based squadrons that normally send detachments to several carriers, like photo reconnaissance, early warning or electronic attack, have frequently received individual tail codes. When deployed, such squadrons usually adopted the tail code of the parent carrier air wing. However, in recent years the practice of assigning individual tail codes to any of the carrier-capable squadrons seems to have been discontinued.
 Land-based squadrons of the U.S. Navy – e.g., patrol, transport, observation and other support squadrons – are assigned individual tail codes. The same has been applicable in the past to Naval Air Stations.
 Each U.S. Marine Corps squadron, regardless of its mission, is assigned its own tail code. When a carrier-capable Marine squadron deploys on an aircraft carrier as a part of the U.S. Navy Carrier Air Wing, it typically adopts the tail code of this Air Wing for the period of deployment.
 A circular letter issued by the CNO in November 1946 specified that code letters on USMC planes were to be underscored. The underscoring of codes was a short-lived practice abandoned by 1949.
 Throughout the history of tail codes there have been a number of duplicates where the same code was used at the same time by more than one unit. This happened frequently during the first post-war decade when the Navy made several revamps of its tail code assignments within a short time frame. Most typically, duplicates resulted when the same letter was assigned to a regular Air Group and to a reserve facility: for example, in the early 1950s the tail code "A" was valid both for Carrier Air Group 15 aircraft and for all Naval Air Reserve units home-based at NAS Anacostia.
 In certain cases Navy or Marine aircraft do not carry tail codes. This happened with aircraft wearing special or experimental camouflage paint, particularly during the Vietnam War deployments. Aircraft of Marine Helicopter Squadron One (HMX-1) employed for VIP transport are another example.
 The U.S. Navy and the Marine Corps do not seem to have any specific procedure for removing a tail code from use. If a unit that owned a particular tail code is disestablished, the respective tail code becomes extinct. Later, this code may be assigned to a different unit, or it may remain unused.

List of navy and marine aircraft tail codes
A

AA

AB

AC

AD

AE

AF

AG
		

AH

AI

	
AJ

AK

AL

AM

AN

AP

AQ

AR

AS

AT

AU

AV

AW

		
AX

AZ

B

BA

BB

BC

BD

BE

BF

BG

BH

BI

BJ

BK

BL

BM

BP

BR

BS

BT

BU

BV

BW

BY

BZ

C

CA

CB

CC

CD

CE

CF

CG

CH

CI

CJ

CK

CM

CN

CP

CQ

CS

CT

CU

CV

CW

CY

CZ

D

DA

DB

DC

DD

DE

DF

DH

DN

DP

DR

DT

DV

DW

DX

DZ

E

EA

EB

EC

ED

EE

EF

EG

EH

EK

EL

EM

EN

EP

ER

ES

ET

EU

EW

EX

EZ

F

FA

FB

FC

FD

FE

FF

FG

FH

FJ

FK

FL

FM

FN

FP

FQ

FR

FS

FT

FU

FZ

G

GA

GB

GC

GD

GE

GF

GH

GJ

GK

GL

GM

GN

GQ

GP

GR

GS

GX

H

HA

HB

HC

HD

HE

HF

HG

HH

HJ

HK

HL

HM

HN

HP

HQ

HR

HS

HT

HU

HV

HW

HX

HY

HZ

I

IF

IL

IP

IT

J

JA

JB

JC

JD

JE

JF

JG

JH

JK

JL

JM

JQ

JR

JS

JT

JU

JV

JW

JY

K

KA

KB

KC

KD

KE

KK

L

LA

LB

LC

LD

LE

LF

LG

		
LH

LI

LJ

		

LK

LL

LM

LN

LP

LQ

		

LR

LS

LT

LU

LV

LW

LX

LY

LZ

M

MA

MB

MC

MD

ME

MF

MG

MH

MI

MJ

MK

		
ML

MN

MM

MP

MQ

MR

MS

MT

MU

MV

MW

MX

MY

N

NA

NB

NC

ND

NE

NF

NG

NH

NJ

NK

NL

NM

NP

NR

		

NS

NT

NU

NV

NW

NY

O

P

PA

PB

PC

PD

PE

PF

PG

PH

PJ

PL

PM

PN

PP

PR

PS

PZ

QA

QB

QC

QD

QE

QF

QG

QH

QJ

QK

QL

QM

QN

QP

QR

QS

QT

QY

QZ

R

RA

RB

RC

RD

RE

RF

RG

RH

RI

RL

RM

RN

RK

RP

RR

RS

RT

RU

RV

RW

RX

RY

RZ

S

SA

SB

SC

SD

SE

SF

SG

SH

SI

SJ

SK

SL

SM

SN

SP

SQ

SR

SS

ST

SU

SV

SW

SX

SY

SZ

T

TA

TB

TC

TD

TE

TF

TG

TH

TJ

TK

TL

TM

TN

TP

TR

TS

TT

TV

TX

TY

TZ

U

UA

UB

UC

UD

UE

UF

UG

UH

UI

UJ

UK

UL

UM

UP

UR

UT

UU

UV

UX

V

VA

VB

VE

VF

VH

VK

VL

VM

VO

VR

VS

VT

VV

VW

VX

VZ

W

WA

WB

WC

WD

WE

WF

WG

WH

WI

WJ

WK

WL

WM

WP

WQ

WR

WS

WT

WU

WV

WW

WX

WZ

X

XA

XB

XC

XD

XE

XF

XM

XX

Y

YA

YB

YC

YD

YF

YG

YH

YJ

YK

YL

YM

YN

YP

YQ

YR

YS

YT

YU

YV

YW

YX

YY

YZ

Z

ZA

ZB

ZC

ZD

ZE

ZF

ZG

ZH

ZR

ZZ

References

 Thomas E. Doll, Berkley R. Jackson, William A. Riley. Navy Air Colors, United States Navy, Marine Corps and Coast Guard Aircraft Camouflage and Markings Vol.1. Carrollton, Texas: Squadron/Signal Publications, 1983. .
 Thomas E. Doll, Berkley R. Jackson, William A. Riley. Navy Air Colors, United States Navy, Marine Corps and Coast Guard Aircraft Camouflage and Markings Vol.2. Carrollton, Texas: Squadron/Signal Publications, 1985. .
 Duane Kasulka. USN Carrier Air Units Volume 1. Carrollton, Texas: Squadron/Signal Publications, 1985. .
 Duane Kasulka. USN Carrier Air Units Volume 2. Carrollton, Texas: Squadron/Signal Publications, 1985. .
 Duane Kasulka. USN Carrier Air Units Volume 3. Carrollton, Texas: Squadron/Signal Publications, 1988. .
 Roy A. Grossnick. Dictionary of American Naval Aviation Squadrons, Volume 1. Washington, D.C: Naval Historical Center, 1995. .
 Michael D. Roberts. Dictionary of American Naval Aviation Squadrons, Volume 2. Washington, D.C: Naval Historical Center, 2000.
 John M. Elliot. The Official Monogram US Navy & Marine Corps Aircraft Color Guide, Vol. 2, 1940–1949. Hong Kong: Monogram Aviation Publications, 1989. 
 John M. Elliot. The Official Monogram US Navy & Marine Corps Aircraft Color Guide, Vol. 3, 1950–1959. Hong Kong: Monogram Aviation Publications, 1991. 
 John M. Elliot. The Official Monogram US Navy & Marine Corps Aircraft Color Guide, Vol. 4, 1960–1993. Hong Kong: Monogram Aviation Publications, 1993. 

United States military aircraft
Aircraft markings
United States naval aviation
Aircraft Tail Codes
United States Marine Corps aviation
Aircraft Tail Codes
Aviation-related lists